Ingrid Haralamow-Raimann (born 29 July 1966) is a Swiss sprint canoer who competed in the 1990s. Competing in two Summer Olympics, she won a silver medal in the K-4 500 m event at Atlanta in 1996.

References
DatabaseOlympics.com profile
Sports-reference.com profile

1966 births
Canoeists at the 1992 Summer Olympics
Canoeists at the 1996 Summer Olympics
Living people
Olympic canoeists of Switzerland
Olympic silver medalists for Switzerland
Swiss female canoeists
Olympic medalists in canoeing

Medalists at the 1996 Summer Olympics